Church of St. Peter and Paul in Bolman is a Serbian Orthodox church in eastern Croatia. The church is dedicated to St. Peter and Paul.

The church is listed in the Register of Cultural Goods of Croatia.

See also
Eparchy of Osječko polje and Baranja
Bolman
Serbs of Croatia
List of Serbian Orthodox churches in Croatia

References

External links
Bolman.info

Bolman
Churches completed in 1777